Patricia Collins may refer to:

Patricia Hill Collins, professor of sociology at the University of Maryland, College Park
Patricia M. Collins, Maine civic leader and former mayor of Caribou, Maine
Patricia Collins (actress), British-Canadian actress
Patricia Collins (Fair City character), fictional character from Irish soap opera Fair City